Carlos Javier Valverde Doblado (born 19 February 1985) is a Spanish professional footballer who plays for Córdoba CF as a right winger.

Club career
Born in Utrera, Seville, Andalusia, Valverde was a Real Betis youth graduate. After playing for both C and B-teams, he moved to Segunda División B side AD Ceuta in 2008.

Valverde subsequently resumed his career in the third division, representing Écija Balompié (two stints), UB Conquense, CP Cacereño, CF Villanovense and Extremadura UD, achieving promotion to Segunda División with the latter in 2018. On 19 August 2018, aged 33, he made his professional debut by starting in a 1–1 away draw against Real Oviedo.

Valverde scored his first professional goal on 30 September 2018, netting the last in a 2–0 home defeat of Elche CF. In December, however, he suffered a knee injury which took him out of the remainder of the season; his contract was immediately renewed by Extremadura.

On 17 January 2020, Valverde cut ties with the Azulgranas, and signed a 18-month deal with Córdoba CF in the third division just hours later.

References

External links

1985 births
Living people
People from Utrera
Sportspeople from the Province of Seville
Spanish footballers
Footballers from Andalusia
Association football wingers
Segunda División players
Segunda División B players
Tercera División players
Divisiones Regionales de Fútbol players
Betis Deportivo Balompié footballers
Écija Balompié players
UB Conquense footballers
CP Cacereño players
CF Villanovense players
Extremadura UD footballers
Córdoba CF players